The Bangladesh Investment Development Authority (BIDA) is the apex investment promotion agency (IPA) of Bangladesh which is responsible for helping foreign investors to set up investments in the country. BIDA promotes and facilitates private investment and advocates business-friendly policies. BIDA provides regulatory services including registration, approvals and recommendations. BIDA is supervised by the Prime Minister's Office. The head office of BIDA is located in Dhaka and its divisional offices are in Chattogram, Rajshahi, Khulna, Sylhet and Barishal.

History
BIDA was formed on September 1, 2016 through the enactment of the Bangladesh Investment Development Authority Act 2016, which merged the then Board of Investment (BOI) and then Privatization Commission to establish the new authority.

Organization 
The Prime Minister is the chair of the governing board of BIDA. The Finance Minister is the vice-chair. The governing board supervises the executive council, which is headed by the executive chairman (senior secretary) and made up of 6 (six) executive members.

Lokman Hossain Miah has been the Executive chairman of the authority since August 23, 2022. He has been appointed to the position for three years.

BIDA has six wings headed by executive members (additional secretary), which are: Strategic Investment, Marketing and Communication, International Investment Promotion, Local Investment Promotion, Investment Environment Services, Investment Ecosystem. The BIDA Secretary heads the administrative wing.

Services 
BIDA is the first stop for investors exploring investment opportunities in Bangladesh. BIDA conducts active promotion of diversified investments in key strategic sectors and facilitates the entry, operation and growth of investment projects. BIDA also provides regulatory, information and aftercare services.

Following are the services offered by BIDA:

 Pre-investment information and counseling service
 Investor welcome service through speedier immigration
 Registration/approval of foreign, joint-venture and local projects
 Registration/approval of branch/liaison/representative offices
 Work permit approval for the foreign nationals
 Approval for remittance of royalty, technical know-how and technical assistance fees
 Facilitating import of capital machinery & raw materials
 Approval of foreign loan suppliers’ credit, PAYE scheme etc.
 Facilitation for utility connections
 Assistance in obtaining industrial plots

Online One Stop Service (OSS) portal 
BIDA hosts the country's first inter-operable online One Stop Service (OSS) Portal. BIDA established this platform by driving the digitization and integration of the investor services of various ministries, departments and agencies in Bangladesh. There are currently 51 services of 16 agencies available on this single-window platform.

BIDA is working to integrate over 150 services of over 40 separate investor service providers. The International Finance Corporation, a development partner of BIDA, is providing technical assistance for the effective development of the OSS portal.

References

2016 establishments in Bangladesh
Investment in Bangladesh
Organisations based in Dhaka
Government agencies of Bangladesh
Investment promotion agencies
Regulators of Bangladesh